InterContinental Singapore Robertson Quay is an InterContinental hotel in Singapore. The hotel is located at Robertson Quay on the Singapore River. Originally the building was the Gallery Hotel which was replaced by InterContinental in late 2017.

Location
Set along the waterfront of the Singapore River, known for its dining options and arts houses, the hotel is located in proximity to Marina Bay and the Central Business District, as well as major city attractions and the Singapore Changi Airport.

Facilities
Designed by SCDA Architects, the hotel’s design blends elements from the district’s industrial past with contemporary finishes. Established as part of a holistic dining and lifestyle destination, the hotel houses a 389-seater Italian restaurant and bar - Publico, as well as a lobby lounge, Quayside Lounge. These are set amidst a number of dining and lifestyle concepts, including Wolfgang’s Steakhouse and 1880, on levels two and three.

Business and recreational facilities include a Club InterContinental Lounge, 5 meeting and event spaces, a swimming pool and a 24-hour fitness studio.

References

External links 
InterContinental Singapore Robertson Quay
InterContinental Hotels Group

InterContinental hotels
Singapore River
Hotels in Singapore
Hotels established in 2017
2017 establishments in Singapore